C'est la Vie is the third studio album by French DJ and record producer Martin Solveig. It was released on 2 June 2008 by Universal Licensing Music and Mixture Stereophonic. It spawned the singles "C'est la Vie", "I Want You" and "One 2.3 Four". A special edition of the album, titled the Definitive Edition, was released on 28 September 2009, containing the single "Boys & Girls" and a bonus disc of remixes.

Track listing
All songs written, composed and produced by Martin Solveig, except "Beauty False" and "Some Other Time" written and produced by Solveig and Michael Tordjman.

Definitive Edition

Personnel

Martin Solveig – lead vocals, backing vocals, instruments, mixing, production, programming
Cyril Atef – drums
Chakib Chambi – lead vocals, backing vocals
Gail Cochrane – spoken words
Tom Coyne – mastering
Sophie Delila – guitar
Lee Fields – lead vocals
Pascal Garnon – engineer
Jean-Baptiste Gaudray – guitar
Quentin Ghomari – trumpet

Stephy Haïk – lead vocals, backing vocals
Armelle Kergall – front and back cover photography
Antoine Le Grand – booklet back photography
Léo & Mona – artwork
Laurent Meyer – saxophone
Guy N'Sangué – bass guitar
Jay Sebag – lead vocals, backing vocals
Loïc Seron – trombone
David Shama – inside photography
Michael Tordjman – instruments, production, programming
Philippe Weiss – mixing

Mixed at Studio Davout, Paris
"C'est la vie" and "Poptimistic" mixed at Mixture Studio, France
Mastered at Sterling Sound, New York City

Charts

Weekly charts

Year-end charts

References

2008 albums
Martin Solveig albums
Universal Music France albums